The following lists events that happened during 2016 in Serbia.

Incumbents 
 President: Tomislav Nikolić
 Prime Minister: Aleksandar Vučić

Events

April 24 - Serbian parliamentary election, 2016
August 5 – 21 - 103 athletes from Serbia will compete at the 2016 Summer Olympics in Rio de Janeiro, Brazil.

References

 
2010s in Serbia
Years of the 21st century in Serbia
Serbia